The 1929 All-Ireland Minor Football Championship was the inaugural staging of the All-Ireland Minor Football Championship, the Gaelic Athletic Association's premier inter-county Gaelic football tournament for boys under the age of 18.

Clare won the championship following a 5-3 to 3-5 defeat of Longford in the All-Ireland final. It remains their only All-Ireland title in this grade.

Results

Connacht Minor Football Championship

Leinster Minor Football Championship

Munster Minor Football Championship

Ulster Minor Football Championship

All-Ireland Minor Football Championship
Semi-Finals

Final
1929	Clare	5–03	Longford	3–05

References

1929
All-Ireland Minor Football Championship